Mountain Hill is an unincorporated community in Harris County, in the U.S. state of Georgia.

History
A post office called Mountain Hill was established in 1853, and remained in operation until 1904. According to tradition, the community was so named because a first settler liked mountains.  A variant name was "Talleytown".

References

Unincorporated communities in Harris County, Georgia